"Everything at Once" is a song written and recorded by the Australian singer Lenka. It was released in November 2012 as the third single from her second studio album, Two (2011).

Release
The song was originally released as the album's second promotional single in 2011, but it was later released as an official single in November 2012.

Chart performance
Two, and the first two singles released from it, "Heart Skips a Beat" and "Two", were commercially unsuccessful. However, after being played in a Windows 8 commercial and Disney Studio All Access teaser; this allowed the song to do much better, becoming Lenka's second most successful single after "The Show".

Music video
The music video shows Lenka wearing a black and white striped dress dancing with two women with the background matching Lenka's dress. Lenka then starts miming with her hands the things she wants to be. Then, she starts dancing with eyes painted on her hands. She then forms a circle with the other women and begins to switch the background in order to match her and the women's dresses. The video then ends with Lenka falling backwards into the women's arms.

Track listings

Charts

Weekly charts

Year-end charts

Certifications

References

2012 singles
Lenka songs
2011 songs